Youssef Zalal (born September 4, 1996) is a Moroccan mixed martial artist who competed in the Featherweight division of the Ultimate Fighting Championship.

Early life
Zalal grew up fighting other kids on the streets of Morocco. His mother put him in kickboxing at the age of 10 to help control his anger. Zalal moved to the United States at age 13.

Mixed martial arts career

Early career

In the beginning of his mixed martial arts career, Zalal fought primarily on the regional circuit in Colorado compiling a 7-2 record, with most of his fights happening for Legacy Fighting Alliance.

Ultimate Fighting Championship

In his promotional debut, Youssef faced fellow newcomer Austin Lingo on February 8, 2020, at UFC 247. He won the fight via unanimous decision.

Youssef faced Jordan Griffin on June 27, 2020, at UFC on ESPN: Poirier vs. Hooker. He won the fight via unanimous decision.

Zalal faced Peter Barrett at UFC Fight Night: Lewis vs. Oleinik on August 8, 2020. He won the fight via unanimous decision.

Zalal was expected to face Seung Woo Choi on  October 11, 2020, at UFC Fight Night 179. However, on October 1, 2020, Choi withdrew from the fight and was replaced by Ilia Topuria. Zalal lost the fight via unanimous decision.

Zalal faced Seung Woo Choi, replacing Collin Anglin, on February 6, 2021, at UFC Fight Night 184. He lost the fight via unanimous decision.

Zalal faced Sean Woodson on June 5, 2021, at UFC Fight Night: Rozenstruik vs. Sakai. He lost the fight via split decision.

Zalal was scheduled to face Cristian Quiñonez on August 13, 2022, at UFC on ESPN: Vera vs. Cruz. However, Quiñonez was forced out of the event due to visa issues, and was replaced by Da'Mon Blackshear. The fight ended in a majority draw.

On August 25, 2022, it was announced that Zalal had been released from the UFC.

Post UFC career
In his first bout after his UFC release, Zalal faced Edwin Chavez on November 18, 2022, at Sparta 93. He won the fight via TKO in the first round.

On January 20, 2023, Zalal faced Jake Childers, at SCL: Fight Night 14 - King of Sparta Welterweight. He won the fight via TKO in the first round.

Mixed martial arts record

|-
|Win
|align=center|12-5-1
|Jake Childers
|TKO (punches)
|SCL: Fight Night 14
|
|align=center|1
|align=center|1:53
|Aurora, Colorado, United States
|
|-
|Win
|align=center|11–5–1
|Edwin Chavez
|TKO (punches)
|Sparta 93
|
|align=center|1
|align=center|3:44
|Denver, Colorado, United States
|
|-
|Draw
|align=center|
|Da'Mon Blackshear
|Draw (majority)
|UFC on ESPN: Vera vs. Cruz
|
|align=center|3
|align=center|5:00
|San Diego, California, United States
|
|-
|Loss
|align=center|10–5
|Sean Woodson
|Decision (split)
|UFC Fight Night: Rozenstruik vs. Sakai
|
|align=center|3
|align=center|5:00
|Las Vegas, Nevada, United States
|
|-
|Loss
|align=center|10–4
|Seung Woo Choi
|Decision (unanimous)
|UFC Fight Night: Overeem vs. Volkov
|
|align=center|3
|align=center|5:00
|Las Vegas, Nevada, United States
|
|-
|Loss
|align=center|10–3
|Ilia Topuria
|Decision (unanimous)
|UFC Fight Night: Moraes vs. Sandhagen
|
|align=center|3
|align=center|5:00
|Abu Dhabi, United Arab Emirates
|
|-
|Win
|align=center|10–2
|Peter Barrett
|Decision (unanimous)
|UFC Fight Night: Lewis vs. Oleinik
|
|align=center|3
|align=center|5:00
|Las Vegas, Nevada, United States
|
|-
|Win
|align=center|9–2
|Jordan Griffin
|Decision (unanimous)
|UFC on ESPN: Poirier vs. Hooker
|
|align=center|3
|align=center|5:00
|Las Vegas, Nevada, United States
|
|-
|Win
|align=center|8–2
|Austin Lingo
|Decision (unanimous)
|UFC 247
|
|align=center|3
|align=center|5:00
|Houston, Texas, United States
|
|-
| Win
| align=center| 7–2
| Jaime Hernandez
| KO (flying knee)
| LFA 79
| 
| align=center| 1
| align=center| 2:15
| Broomfield, Colorado, United States
| 
|-
| Loss
| align=center| 6–2
| Matt Jones
| Decision (split)
| LFA 65
| 
| align=center| 3
| align=center| 5:00
| Vail, Colorado, United States
| 
|-
| Loss
| align=center| 6–1
| Jose Mariscal
| Decision (unanimous)
| LFA 57
| 
| align=center| 3
| align=center| 5:00
| Broomfield, Colorado, United States
| 
|-
| Win
| align=center| 6–0
| Steven Merrill
| Submission (brabo choke)
| LFA 56
| 
| align=center| 1
| align=center| 3:22
| Prior Lake, Minnesota, United States
| 
|-
| Win
| align=center| 5–0
| Daniel Soto
| Submission (rear-naked choke)
| LFA 39
| 
| align=center| 2
| align=center| 1:38
| Vail, Colorado, United States
| 
|-
| Win
| align=center| 4–0
| Joey Banks
| Submission (armbar)
| Paramount MMA
| 
| align=center| 3
| align=center| 1:58
| Denver, Colorado, United States
| 
|-
| Win
| align=center| 3–0
| Clay Wimer
| Submission (guillotine choke)
| Mile High MMAyhem
| 
| align=center| 2
| align=center| 2:42
| Glendale, Colorado, United States
| 
|-
| Win
| align=center| 2–0
| Maurice Salazar
| TKO (punches)
| LFA 22
| 
| align=center| 2
| align=center| 4:41
| Broomfield, Colorado, United States
| 
|-
| Win
| align=center| 1–0
| Michael Santos
| Submission (brabo choke)
| SCL 61
| 
| align=center| 3
| align=center| 1:38
| Denver, Colorado, United States
|

See also 
 List of male mixed martial artists

References

External links 
  
 

1996 births
Living people
Moroccan male mixed martial artists
American male mixed martial artists
Sportspeople from Casablanca
Moroccan practitioners of Brazilian jiu-jitsu
American practitioners of Brazilian jiu-jitsu
Moroccan emigrants to the United States
Featherweight mixed martial artists
Mixed martial artists utilizing Brazilian jiu-jitsu
Ultimate Fighting Championship male fighters